This page details Northern Ireland national under-21 football team records and statistics; the most capped players, the players with the most goals, and Northern Ireland under-21's match record by opponent.

Player records

Most capped players

Caps and goals updated as of 25 September 2022 after the match against .

Players with an equal number of caps are ranked in chronological order of reaching the milestone.

Highest goalscorers 
Caps and goals updated as of 25 September 2022 after the match against .

Players with an equal number of goals are ranked in chronological order of reaching the milestone.

Hat-tricks 
The result is presented with Northern Ireland's score first.

Red cards 
The result is presented with Northern Ireland's score first.

Individual and Team records

Goal records
 First goal: Gary Blackledge – 8 March 1978 vs 
 Most goals scored in one game by a player: 3 – Billy Kee, 10 August 2011 vs

Firsts
 First under-21 international: 8 March 1978 vs 
 First home under-21 international: 3 April 1990 vs 
 First win: 3 April 1990 vs 
 First overseas opponent: , 3 April 1990
 First win over an overseas opponent: 3 April 1990 vs

Streaks
 Most consecutive victories: 6
 6 February 2006 – 16 May 2016
 6 September 2018 – 25 March 2019
 Most consecutive matches without defeat: 11
 9 September 2003 – 16 May 2006
 Most consecutive draws: 3
 29 May 2000 – 1 September 2000
 Most consecutive matches without a draw: 25
 6 February 2006 – 18 November 2008
 Most consecutive matches without victory: 14
 2 September 2011 – 14 November 2013
 Most consecutive defeats: 14
 2 September 2011 – 14 November 2013
 Most consecutive matches scoring: 8
 8 February 2005 – 16 May 2006
 Most consecutive matches without scoring: 4
 2 September 2011 – 10 May 2012
 Most consecutive matches conceding a goal: 29
 2 June 1999 – 9 September 2003
 Most consecutive matches without conceding a goal: 3
 6 February 2006 – 28 February 2006
 11 October 2018 – 22 March 2019

Biggest wins

Heaviest defeats

Performance

Performance by competition

Last updated after the match against  on 25 September 2022.

Performance by manager

Last updated after the match against  on 25 September 2022.

 * first two games as caretaker manager
 ** all 7 games as caretaker manager

Performance by venue

Last updated after the match against  on 25 September 2022.

Performance by decade

Last updated after the match against  on 25 September 2022.

All-time records

Head to head records
Last updated after the match against  on 25 September 2022.

UEFA under-21 teams yet to play against Northern Ireland
Last updated after the match against  on 25 September 2022.

Competitive record
 Champions  Runners-up  Third Place  Fourth Place

UEFA European Under-21 Championship Record

Minor tournaments

Honours

Titles 
Presidents Cup
Winners (1): 1998

Notes

References

External links 

 Irish Football Association – Northern Ireland Football official site
 Northern Ireland Stats & Statistics
 RSSSF archive of international results 1882–
 RSSSF archive of most capped players and highest goalscorers

Under 21s
Northern Ireland national under-21 football team
Association football in Northern Ireland